Baleshwar Yadav (born 1 January 1942) is an Indian politician. He stood for the 2004 Lok Sabha elections and he was elected from Padrauna for the 14th Lok Sabha.

External links
 Official biography from Parliament of India records

1942 births
Living people
People from Uttar Pradesh
People from Gorakhpur
People from Kushinagar district
India MPs 2004–2009
Lok Sabha members from Uttar Pradesh
Samajwadi Party politicians
Janata Dal politicians
India MPs 1989–1991
Lok Dal politicians
Indian National Congress politicians from Uttar Pradesh